Olof Gustaf Hugo Lagercrantz (10 March 1911 – 23 July 2002) was a Swedish writer, critic, literary scholar (PhD 1951) and publicist (editor-in-chief of Dagens Nyheter 1960–1975).

Life and career
Lagercrantz was born in Stockholm, Sweden, the son of bank director , of the noble Lagercrantz family, and Countess Agnes Hamilton. He married Martina Ruin (born 1921), daughter of Professor Hans Ruin and Karin Sievers, in 1939. Lagercrantz is the father of actress Marika Lagercrantz and author David Lagercrantz. His sister Lis Asklund was an author, social worker, curator, and program producer for Sveriges Radio. His nephews Lars and Johan Lönnroth are also famous in their own right. 

His childhood was gloomy influenced by his mother's mental illness and later his sister's suicide. 

Lagercrantz commanded considerable influence as a critic and publicist. He became an expert of sorts in literary biography, and several of his studies on important Swedish writers are still cornerstones of Swedish literary studies, in particular, his biography of August Strindberg (1979) and his portrait of his friend Gunnar Ekelöf, .

During the latter part of his professional life, Lagercrantz' concerns in his role as literary critic and cultural pundit progressed from the strictly aesthetic to the political. In 1958, he published a biography of the late poet Stig Dagerman which was severely criticized by a young Beppe Wolgers for being confined to Dagerman's "dark predicament" and not completely representing a man "who paid such great interest to cinema as well as football". Lagercrantz' political engagement became apparent during his time at Dagens Nyheter, where he was head of the cultural section from 1951 and editor-in-chief from 1960 on. He was an influential, albeit controversial, voice in the political and cultural radicalism of the 1960s and 1970s, assuming a crucial role in the national secularization debate.

Lagercrantz in his public role gave rise to strong emotions. His cultural radicalism in particular was perceived as provocative in light of his aristocratic background. Lagercrantz was widely criticized for the conciliatory and fairly positive appraisals of Communism that he published in Dagens Nyheter after travelling as a journalist to the Soviet Union and China.

Lagercrantz dwelt on parts of this in his autobiographical works.

Lagercrantz grew up in Falköping and in 2001 was awarded the title of Honorary Resident of Skaraborg by the Skaraborg Academy in tribute to the fact he had wielded one of the mightiest pens of the 20th century. He was also awarded the Illis quorum by the government of Sweden in 1996.

Bibliography
  ("The Dead Bird", 1935, poems) 
  ("The Only Summer", 1937, poems) 
  ("The Maiden and the Demons", 1938, a study of Erik Axel Karlfeldt) 
  (1939, novel) 
  ("Facing the Bible", 1941) 
  ("Poems from the Bog", 1943) 
  ("On Love", 1946) 
  ("The Bird's Call Out of the Fog", 1947, essays) 
  ("Syllabus of Swedish Lyric Poetry", 1950) 
 Agnes von Krusenstierna (1951, revised 1980, literary study) 
  ("Diary", 1954) 
  ("Poems and Diary", 1955) 
 Stig Dagerman (1958, literary study) 
  ("Solitudes in the East and the West", 1961, travel literature) 
  ("Swedish Lyric Poets", 1961) 
  ("Lines", 1962, poems) 
  ("From Hell to Paradise", 1964, a study of Dante) 
  ("Poems 1935–1962", 1964) 
  ("The Creation in Progress", 1966, a study of Nelly Sachs) 
  ("Current Opinions", 1968) 
  ("To Exist", 1970, a study of James Joyce) 
  ("Comfort for My Beloved", 1971) 
  ("Thirteen Lyric Poets and the Troop of Birds", 1973) 
  ("The Unicorn", 1977, prose) 
  ("From Aeneas to Ahlin", 1978) 
 August Strindberg (1979, literary study) 
  ("Second Thoughts on Strindberg", 1980) 
  ("My First Circle", 1982, autobiography) 
  ("On the Art of Reading and Writing", 1985, essay) 
  ("A Journey with the Heart of Darkness", 1987, a study of Joseph Conrad) 
  ("A Year in the 60s", 1990, autobiography) 
  ("A Bleeding Rose", 1991, selected poems) 
  ("Reading Proust", 1992) 
  ("I Live in Another World, but You Live in the Same", 1994, a study of Gunnar Ekelöf) 
  ("My Own Words", 1994, selection of articles from Dagens Nyheter) 
  ("The Poem of Life on the Other Side", 1996, a study of Emanuel Swedenborg)

References

1911 births
2002 deaths
Nordic Council Literature Prize winners
Writers from Stockholm
Swedish literary critics
Swedish male writers
Swedish newspaper publishers (people)
Swedish newspaper editors
Dagens Nyheter editors
Olof
Recipients of the Illis quorum